Paul Ginisty (4 April 1855 – 5 March 1932) was a French writer, columnist and journalist.

A regular columnist at Gil Blas, he met Guy de Maupassant who would dedicate him his short story . From 1896 to 1906, he was theatre manager for the Théâtre de l'Odéon, then became an inspector of monuments historiques.

Selected bibliography 
1881: Les Idylles parisiennes, (text online at Gallica).
1883: Les Rastaquouères : études parisiennes, (text online at Gallica).
1884: L'Amour à trois, foreword by Guy de Maupassant.
1884: La Seconde Nuit, roman bouffe, (text online at Gallica).
1888: Le Dieu bibelot, publisher A-Dupret
1901: La Marquise de Sade
1907: Mémoires d'un danseuse de corde : Mme Saqui (1786-1866), (text online at Gallica).
1914: Mémoires et souvenirs de comédiennes XVIIIe
1922: Anthologie du journalisme du XVIIe siècle à nos jours1923: Les Nids d'aigles1925: Les Anciens Boulevards1929: Eugène Sue1930: Souvenirs de journalisme et de théâtre'', (text online at Gallica).

References

External links
 Notice d'autorité sur le site de la BnF

Writers from Paris
1855 births
1932 deaths
20th-century French writers
19th-century French journalists
French male journalists
20th-century French journalists
French theatre managers and producers
19th-century French male writers
20th-century French male writers